In mathematics, a nonempty subset  of a group  is said to be symmetric if it contains the inverses of all of its elements.

Definition 

In set notation a subset  of a group  is called  if whenever  then the inverse of  also belongs to  
So if  is written multiplicatively then  is symmetric if and only if  where  
If  is written additively then  is symmetric if and only if  where 

If  is a subset of a vector space then  is said to be a  if it is symmetric with respect to the additive group structure of the vector space; that is, if  which happens if and only if  

Sufficient conditions 

Arbitrary unions and intersections of symmetric sets are symmetric.

Any vector subspace in a vector space is a symmetric set.

Examples 

Any balanced subset of a real or complex vector space is symmetric.

See also

References 

 R. Cristescu, Topological vector spaces, Noordhoff International Publishing, 1977.
  
  
  
  

Group theory